Jawaharlal Nehru Stadium is a multi-purpose stadium in Kottayam, Kerala. The ground is mostly used for athletics and football. It is one of the Indian stadiums named after Jawaharlal Nehru.

The ground has capacity of 18,000 person was established in 1972. The stadium has hosted cricket matches from 1972 to 1993 which in five first-class matches and two List A matches.  The stadium went for renovation in 2014 with a swimming pool, synthetic track,  basketball & tennis courts etc.

External links

 Wikimapia
 Cricketarchive

References

Multi-purpose stadiums in India
Football venues in Kerala
Sports venues in Kerala
Buildings and structures in Kottayam district
Athletics (track and field) venues in India
Monuments and memorials to Jawaharlal Nehru
Sport in Kottayam
1972 establishments in Kerala